The NZR U class was a class of two 4-6-0 steam locomotives built by the Baldwin Locomotive Works in 1904 for the Wellington and Manawatu Railway Company. When that company was nationalised in 1908, they passed into the ownership of the New Zealand Railways and received the designation U.

Introduction 
The two locomotives were the final new motive power ordered by the independent Wellington and Manawatu Railway Company.

Specification
The  coupled driving wheels were large for the period,  and were the largest to run in New Zealand.

The handsome UD locomotives were more than capable of making up lost time, with mile-a-minute runs recalled with pride by Manawatu railway employees. Due to their power, the locomotives were capable of hauling mail trains without the need for a banking locomotive from Paekakariki south to Pukerua Bay, and were used principally on mail trains north of Paekakariki.

Withdrawal
Although they were fast and powerful, the UD locomotives were unable to survive a programme of standardisation undertaken between 1925 and 1935 to eliminate small locomotive classes that were costly to maintain in favour of large, homogeneous types that provided economies of scale. They were written off in 1929.

References

Citations

Bibliography

External links
Photo of 1910 derailment at  Koputaroa

UD class
4-6-0 locomotives
Baldwin locomotives
Scrapped locomotives
Railway locomotives introduced in 1904